Naoufel Berraoui is a Moroccan filmmaker, actor, and decorator.

Personal life 
Berraoui is married to Moroccan actress Touria Alaoui. He attended the Institut Supérieur d'Art Dramatique et d'Animation Culturelle in Rabat.

Partial filmography 
 Liberté provisoire (2007)
 Youm ou lila (2013)

References 

Moroccan film directors
21st-century Moroccan male actors
Living people
Year of birth missing (living people)